Mangelia senegalensis is a species of sea snail, a marine gastropod mollusk in the family Mangeliidae.

Distribution
This species occurs in the Atlantic Ocean off Senegal.

References

External links
  Tucker, J.K. 2004 Catalog of recent and fossil turrids (Mollusca: Gastropoda). Zootaxa 682:1–1295.

senegalensis
Molluscs of the Atlantic Ocean
Invertebrates of West Africa
Gastropods described in 1883